BNT Shibsha is a Damen Stan Tug 3008 class Fleet Coastal Tug of the Bangladeshi Navy. She was commissioned to Bangladeshi Navy on 3 October 2004.

Design
BNT Shibsha is a medium harbor tug. This ship was built at Khulna Shipyard with Dutch technical assistance. She incorporate many equipment and materials of South Korean origin.

See also
List of active ships of the Bangladesh Navy
BNT Rupsha

References

Tugboats of the Bangladesh Navy
Ships built at Khulna Shipyard